Best of 3 CD is a compilation album by Welsh singer Bonnie Tyler. It was released in 2011 by Sony. The album features three CDs including some of her early hit songs, and selections from recent albums Simply Believe (2004), Wings (2005) and Bonnie Tyler Live (2006).

The compilation features three previously unreleased tracks, including a bilingual version of the Bangles' "Eternal Flame" with French singer Laura Zen which became the album's lead single.

Release and promotion 
"Amour Éternel (Eternal Flame)" was released to commercial radio on 29 August 2011 and reached no. 250 on the French Airplay chart. Tyler and Zen performed the song on the French TV show Génération 90 broadcast by TF1 on 24 September 2011. Tyler later appeared on Les Grands du rire for an interview broadcast by France 3 on 10 December 2011.

Best of 3 CD was first released to digital platforms on 26 September 2011, before receiving a physical release on 3 October 2011.

Critical reception 
In an unrated review for AllMusic, Jon O'Brien noted the compilation's "generous 53 tracks" which offer a "comprehensive overview of Welsh rock songstress Bonnie Tyler's impressive 34-year career".

Commercial performance 
Best of 3 CD entered the French Albums chart at no. 36, its peak position, and spent a total of five weeks on the chart. Best of 3 CD peaked at no. 6 on the French Compilation Albums chart. The compilation also charted in French-speaking Belgian territory Wallonia. It spent three weeks on the Wallonian Ultratop 200 Albums chart, entering at no. 48, its peak position. The compilation also spent one week on the Wallonia Heatseekers Top 20 Albums at no. 10.

Track listing

Notes
  French adaptation of lyrics
  Pseudonym for Jean Lahcène
  Pseudonym for Olivier Renoir

Charts

References

2011 greatest hits albums
Bonnie Tyler compilation albums
Sony Music compilation albums